USS Migrant (IX‑66) was a schooner of the United States Navy during World War II.
The ship was built in 1929 by George Lawley & Sons, Neponset, Massachusetts, and acquired from Carl Tucker by the Port Director, New York, for the US Navy on 21 March 1942, converted by the Sullivan Shipyard, Brooklyn, New York, and commissioned on 19 May 1942.

Service history
Acquired originally for use in the 3rd Naval District, Migrant was assigned to the Eastern Sea Frontier following her conversion and commissioning. Until the spring of 1944 she conducted anti-submarine patrols from New York, along the southern New England coast. Transferred on 30 April 1944 to the 1st Naval District at Boston, she conducted ASW patrols along the northern New England coast for the remainder of her Navy career.

Migrant, ordered inactivated in June 1945, was decommissioned at East Boston on 3 August. Struck from the Naval Vessel Register ten days later, she remained at East Boston until 6 January 1946 when she was turned over to the War Shipping Administration for disposal.

References 
 

Unclassified miscellaneous vessels of the United States Navy
Ships built in Boston
1929 ships